Lou Yangsheng (born October 1959) is a Chinese politician and the current Communist Party Secretary of Henan province. Originally from Zhejiang province, Lou was the Communist Party Secretary of Lishui in his early career. He headed the party's propaganda department in Hainan before being transferred to Shanxi to become the provincial Deputy Party Secretary.

Biography
Lou Yangsheng was born in Pujiang County, Zhejiang, in 1959. During the Cultural Revolution, he worked as a sent-down youth in rural areas near his hometown. In March 1979, Lou was one of the first batch of students admitted to university after the restoration of the Gaokao exams under Deng Xiaoping. He attended Zhejiang Normal University and joined the Chinese Communist Party during his time at the university. He then worked as a middle school teacher in Longyou County. In 1984, Lou became the Communist Youth League secretary of county, beginning his political career.

Lou spent most of his political career in Zhejiang. He rose quickly in the Communist Youth League system, through 'acid tests' in Longyou County in the local party organization there. Then he was elevated to CYL leader of Quzhou, then CYL leader of Zhejiang province. In June 1997, he earned a Master's Business Administration (MBA) from Zhejiang University. In 1999, he began a short term as a visiting scholar at University of Houston in the United States. In November 1999, he left the CYL system to become mayor of Jinhua, then party secretary the city of Lishui. During his terms in Jinhua and Lishui, Lou worked under the direction of then-Zhejiang party secretary Xi Jinping. As such Lou has been named by political observers as a member of the "New Zhijiang Army", politicians who once worked under Xi and share his governing philosophies.

In January 2008, he became vice chair of the People's Political Consultative Conference of Zhejiang and the head of the province's United Front Department. In January 2009, Lou left Zhejiang to become a member of the provincial Party Standing Committee of Hainan and the province's party organization department head; in February 2010 he became concurrently the secretary of the Education Work Commission of the province. In 2012 he was transferred again, this time to Hubei, to serve on the standing committee there and also as head of the provincial organization department.

After the Shanxi "political earthquake" of 2014 which led to the demise of many top officials in the province, Lou was transferred to Shanxi province to become deputy party secretary; he replaced Jin Daoming, who was dismissed due to corruption. On August 30, 2016, Lou was appointed acting governor of Shanxi province; he was confirmed as governor on November 28.

In November 2019, Lou was appointed as the Communist Party Secretary of Shanxi.

In June 2021, Lou was appointed as the Communist Party Secretary of Henan.

References

1959 births
Living people
People's Republic of China politicians from Zhejiang
Chinese Communist Party politicians from Zhejiang
Members of the 19th Central Committee of the Chinese Communist Party
Members of the 11th Chinese People's Political Consultative Conference
Delegates to the 12th National People's Congress
Delegates to the 10th National People's Congress
Zhejiang Normal University alumni
Zhejiang University alumni
Deputy Communist Party secretaries of Shanxi
Governors of Shanxi
Politicians from Jinhua
CCP committee secretaries of Henan